Alfred Osborn Pope Nicholson (August 31, 1808March 23, 1876), was a lawyer, newspaper editor, banker, and politician from Tennessee. A Democrat, he was twice a US Senator from that state.

Biography
Nicholson was born near Franklin, Tennessee, in Williamson County.  He attended the University of North Carolina at Chapel Hill, graduating in 1827.  He studied law and was admitted to the bar in 1831, opening a law practice in Columbia, Tennessee.  He edited the Western Mercury, a paper then published in Columbia, from 1832 to 1835.  He also served in the Tennessee House of Representatives from 1833 to 1839.  In 1840 he was appointed, on an interim basis, to succeed to the US Senate seat vacated by the death of Senator Felix Grundy.  He served in that office from December 25, 1840, to February 7, 1842.  From 1843 to 1845 he served in the Tennessee State Senate, moving to Nashville during this period. He edited the Nashville Union from 1844 to 1846. From 1846 to 1847 he served as a director, and then as president, of the Bank of Tennessee. He owned slaves.

In 1853 President Franklin Pierce wished to appoint him to the Cabinet, but he declined to serve. He edited the Washington Union from 1853 to 1856 and subsequently served as public printer to the United States House of Representatives.

In 1859, Nicholson was elected to the US Senate by the Tennessee General Assembly. He served from March 4, 1859, to March 3, 1861, when he withdrew from participation in the Senate in anticipation of Tennessee declaring secession, which occurred the next month.  Later in 1861, he was formally expelled from the Senate, as were all other Senators from Confederate states, with the sole exception of his fellow Tennessean Andrew Johnson, a loyal Unionist.  After the Civil War, Nicholson served as chief justice of the Tennessee Supreme Court from 1870 until his death.

He died on March 23, 1876, in Columbia, Tennessee. He was buried in Columbia's Rose Hill Cemetery.

See also
 List of United States senators expelled or censured

References

 Retrieved on 2009-03-23

|-

1808 births
1876 deaths
People from Williamson County, Tennessee
Democratic Party United States senators from Tennessee
Expelled United States senators
Democratic Party members of the Tennessee House of Representatives
Democratic Party Tennessee state senators
Chief Justices of the Tennessee Supreme Court
Tennessee lawyers
American slave owners
American male journalists
19th-century American judges
19th-century American lawyers
19th-century American male writers
19th-century American newspaper editors
19th-century American politicians
People from Columbia, Tennessee
People from Nashville, Tennessee
University of North Carolina at Chapel Hill alumni
People of Tennessee in the American Civil War
United States senators who owned slaves